Yili Normal University is a higher normal school in Ili Kazakh Autonomous Prefecture, Xinjiang, China. It is co-funded by the Ministry of Education, Xinjiang Uygur Autonomous Government, and Jiangsu Provincial Government with the support from Nanjing University and Nanjing Normal University.

History 

 April 17, 1948: Yili Vocational College
 October, 1949: Ehmetjan Vocational College
 April, 1953: Yili Normal School
 May 7, 1980: Yili Normal College
 December, 2018: Yili Normal University

References

External links 

 Yili Normal University 

Teachers colleges in China
Universities and colleges in Xinjiang
Educational institutions established in 1948
1948 establishments in China